Joshua Amponsem is a Ghanaian climate advocate and the Founder of Green Africa Youth Organization (GAYO). He is the climate specialist at the Office of the UN Secretary General's Envoy on Youth. He is the Lead Author of Adapt for Our Future, the first-ever research paper on the role of youth in advancing climate adaptation. His career has focused on grassroots climate and waste management solutions while advancing youth engagement in resilience building, disaster risk reduction, and climate change adaptation at the international level

Climate Advocacy 
Amponsem started his climate advocacy in 2014 as a Bachelor student at the University of Cape Coast where he first learnt about climate change. In 2014 and 2015, ahead of and after the COP21 UN Climate Conference to adopt the Paris Agreement, Amponsem joined the Ghana Youth Environmental Movement to lead series of street protests in Accra in the quest to halt a coal-fired power plant project proposed by the Government of Ghana.  Amponsem quickly established the Green Africa Youth Organization as a student initiative to deliver climate solutions. He described his motivation as an effort to "translate academic conversations from the classroom into practical solutions for communities". Amponsem attended his first international climate conference, COP22, in 2016 as a Global Peace Initiative of Women Fellow where he raised awareness on the need for female leadership and the absence of indigenous knowledge in climate dialogues. He later co-authored a book, The Power of the Feminine: Facing Shadow Evoking Light where he described his relationship with water and the urgent need for humanity to restore our relationship with nature. His advocacy on gender equity, which he described as "a necessity to ensure a viable economic transformation while protecting ecological and natural resources", led him to co-design the Water for Adaptation Project in 2017 to provide water accessibility to a community in Northern Ghana where 66.75% of girls miss school days due to climate change induced water scarcity. In 2018, he attended the UNFCCC Adaptation Committee Meeting where he started his advocacy on the urgency to build expertise and deploy finance for frontline communities to adapt to already occurring climate impacts

Initiatives 
He has been an adaptation fellow at the Global Center on Adaptation (GCA) since 2020. Joshua studied MSc in Geography of Environmental Risks and Human Security offered by UNU-EHS at the University of Bonn. He has led several community-support projects to engineer sustainable development and launched various climate initiatives in Ghana. He attends key UN events and summits as a speaker to discuss the importance of youth participation in climate adaptation policies. He was one of judges of Afri-Plastics Challenge initiative where he called for investing in waste management innovation to tackle plastic pollution. He initiated the Global Alliance for Youth Climate Councils which held an event with Youth Climate Councils in Ghana, Netherlands, Denmark, Brazil and youth climate networks in Uganda during The Stockholm+50 international meeting held in Stockholm on 2–3 June 2022.

References

External links 
 Green Africa Youth Organization (GAYO)

Living people
Climate activists
Youth climate activists
Ghanaian environmentalists
1991 births